Coniophanes meridanus, the  peninsula stripeless snake, is a species of snake in the family Colubridae. The species is native to Mexico.

References

Coniophanes
Snakes of North America
Reptiles described in 1936
Endemic reptiles of Mexico
Fauna of the Yucatán Peninsula
Taxa named by Karl Patterson Schmidt